This is a listing of the horses that finished in either first, second, or third place and the number of starters in the Metropolitan Handicap, an American Grade 1 race for horses three years old and older at one mile on dirt held at Belmont Park in Elmont, New York.  (List 1973-present)

References 

Belmont Park